Richard Lippold (May 3, 1915 – August 22, 2002) was an American sculptor, known for his geometric constructions using wire as a medium.

Life
Lippold was born in Milwaukee, Wisconsin. He studied at the University of Chicago, and graduated from the School of the Art Institute of Chicago in industrial design in 1937.
Lippold worked as an industrial designer from 1937 to 1941. After he became a sculptor, Lippold taught at several universities, including Hunter College at the City University of New York, from 1952 to 1967.

When describing Lippold's floor-to-ceiling sculpture "Trinity", the American artist Howard Newman said:
Lippold was an engineering genius, but we've been dealing with a piece that had reached the threshold of catastrophe,...People's mouths fall open when they see it going back up, like they're watching a spider spin a web of blazing gold,...The more that goes up, the more exquisite it gets.

The 14th and 15th of John Cage's famous Sonatas and Interludes for prepared piano are subtitled Gemini – after the work of Richard Lippold.

Works
1949–50, Variation Number 7: Full Moon, at the Museum of Modern Art in New York City
1950, World Tree, in Harvard Graduate Center at Harvard Law School in Cambridge, Massachusetts. Walter Gropius, designer
1950–51, Aerial Act, at the Wadsworth Atheneum in Hartford, Connecticut
1953–56, Variation within a Sphere, Number 10: The Sun, at the Metropolitan Museum of Art in New York City, which includes more than two miles of gold wire; first commissioned work by this museum.
1958–60, Trinity, Chapel of Portsmouth Abbey School, Portsmouth, RI. Pietro Belluschi, building architect.
1958, Radiant I, at the Inland Steel Building in Chicago, IL. Skidmore, Owings & Merrill, building architects
1959, Untitled, The Four Seasons, and Seagram Building Construction No. 1, at the Four Seasons Restaurant, Seagram Building, New York City.  Philip Johnson, Mies Van der Rohe building architects. 
1959, Great Lone Star, at the Longview National Bank, Longview, TX.
1959, Spirit Vine (label art), The Museum of Wine in Art, Château Mouton Rothschild, Pauillac, France.
1961, Homage to Our Age, Reception Area, J. Walter Thompson, New York City.
1962, Orpheus and Apollo, at Avery Fisher Hall at Lincoln Center in New York City, with architect Max Abramovitz
1963, Flight, PanAm Building, New York, NY, with architects Emery Roth, Pietro Belluschi, Walter Gropius.
1966, Gemini II, at Jones Hall, Houston, TX. William Wayne Caudill, building architect.
1967–70, Baldacchino, St. Mary's Cathedral, San Francisco, CA.  Pietro Belluschi, building architect.
1970, Homage to North Carolina, at North Carolina National Bank, Charlotte, North Carolina, 
later at North Carolina Museum of Art in Raleigh, North Carolina
1970, Youth, Fine Arts Museum of the South, Mobile, Alabama. 
1975, Flora Raris, Hyatt Regency Atlanta
1975, Homage to H.I.H. the Late King Faisal, InterContinental Hotel Conference Center, Riyadh, Saudi Arabia
1976, Ad Astra, at the National Air and Space Museum in Washington, DC. Gyo Obata, building architect.
1977, Untitled, Grand Court, Columbia Mall, Columbia, South Carolina
1977, In Skyspace, Kish International Airport, Kish Island, Iran
1980, Wings of Welcome at the Hyatt Regency, in Milwaukee, Wisconsin.  Py-Vavra, building architect.
1981, Winged Gamma, for Park Avenue Atrium Building, New York with office of Edward Durell Stone
1984, Untitled, One Financial Center, Boston
1985, Primal Energy, Sohio Headquarters, Cleveland, Ohio
1985, Counterpoint with Architecture, Deutsche Bank, Frankfurt, Germany
1986, Fire Bird at the Orange County Performing Art Center, Costa Mesa, California. Cesar Pelli, building architect.
1986, Copper Crystal, Crystal Park II Building, Crystal City, Arlington, Virginia
1986, Homage to South Korea, Dae-Han Building, Seoul, Korea
1986, Orchidea, Marina Mandarin Hotel, Singapore
1988, Ex Stasis, Haggerty Museum, Marquette University, Milwaukee, Wisconsin.  Kahler Slater, building architect.
1988, Encounter at Fairlane Town Center, Dearborn, Michigan (de-installed pending conservation)

Group exhibitions
 Origins of Modern Sculpture, 1945 Organized by Wilhelm Valentiner
 Detroit Institute of Arts, January 22, 1946, to March 3, 1946
 City Art Museum of Saint Louis, March 30, 1946, to May 1, 1946

Solo exhibitions
 Willard Gallery 1947, 1948,1949, 1950, 1951, 1952, 1961, 1968, 1973
 Arts Club of Chicago, Richard Lippold Sculpture, 1954
 Patrick and Beatrice Haggerty Museum of Art, Richard Lippold: Sculpture, 1990–91

Publications
Notes in Passing, by Richard Lippold, Arts & Architecture, August 1947.
Before Band Wagons, Allene Talmey, Vogue Magazine. August 15, 1949, p. 133.
Craft Horizons, June 1952.
Four Artists in a Mansion, Harpers Bazaar, July 1952.
French Vogue, May 1955.
Lippold Makes a Construction, by Lawerence Campbell, Art News, Oct. 1956.
Eye on the Sun, Vogue, February 1, 1958.
Profiles: A Thing Among Things, Calvin Tompkins, New Yorker, March 1963.
Synergizing Space, Sculpture, Architecture and Richard Lippold at Lincoln Center, Marin R. Sullivan, American Art, Summer 2019.

References

External links
Lippold in the Columbia Encyclopedia
 Marika Herskovic, New York School Abstract Expressionists Artists Choice by Artists, (New York School Press, 2000.) 
The 1959 Chateau Mouton Rothschild Label by: Richard Lippold 
Richard Lippold "Shapes of the New Sculpture" The Baltimore Museum of Art: Baltimore, Maryland, 1964 Accessed June 26, 2012
Richard Lippold & Orpheus and Apollo

1915 births
2002 deaths
Artists from Milwaukee
Hunter College faculty
University of Chicago alumni
School of the Art Institute of Chicago alumni
20th-century American sculptors
20th-century American male artists
American male sculptors
Sculptors from Wisconsin
Members of the American Academy of Arts and Letters